Olin George Kreutz (born June 9, 1977) is an American former professional football player who was a center in the National Football League (NFL) for fourteen seasons. He played college football for University of Washington, and earned consensus All-American honors. He was drafted by the Chicago Bears in the third round of the 1998 NFL Draft and played professionally for the Bears and, very briefly, for the New Orleans Saints of the NFL. Kreutz was a semi-finalist for the NFL Hall of Fame in 2020 after being named to the 2000s All-Decade Team, and is frequently cited as one of the greatest modern offensive linemen.

Early years
Kreutz was born in Honolulu, Hawaii. He is the youngest of four sons born to Henry Kreutz, Jr., of Aina Haina. He attended football powerhouse Saint Louis School in Honolulu, where he lettered in high school football, and was teammates with Dominic Raiola, who was two years behind him, and Chris Fuamatu-Maʻafala.

Kreutz also excelled in wrestling and track and field. He received All-State and SuperPrep All-America honors while serving as football team captain during his senior year, and would additionally go on to win the Hawaii state wrestling heavyweight championship.

College career
Kreutz attended the University of Washington, where he played for the Washington Huskies football team under coach Jim Lambright. In 1996, Kreutz was involved in an altercation with defensive tackle Sekou Wiggs in spring practice.  It continued in the lockerroom where Kreutz punched Wiggs, leaving Wiggs with a broken jaw. Wiggs lost 65 pounds and never resumed his role as a starter. Kreutz was recognized as a consensus first-team All-American and earned Pac-10 honors during his junior year, after which he elected to turn pro.

Professional career

NFL Draft
According to Sports Illustrated, Kreutz was the No. 1 center available in the 1998 NFL Draft. He was described as "a good technician" who "has all the physical tools to be a solid NFL player" while being able to "handle really big NT and DT." The Chicago Bears drafted Kreutz in the third round, 64th overall. He was the highest selected Washington interior lineman since Ed Cunningham in 1992. It was also the second consecutive year in which the Bears selected an offensive lineman from Washington, after Bob Sapp in 1997.

Chicago Bears
Over his thirteen-year career with the Bears, Kreutz was selected to six Pro Bowls, was selected once as a 1st team All-Pro, and was one of the team's most consistent offensive linemen. He started 182 regular-season games for the Bears, second only to Walter Payton.

In an incident eerily reminiscent of his college days, Kreutz drew controversy during the 2005 NFL season after breaking the jaw of fellow offensive lineman Fred Miller during an off-practice outing. The NFL fined both players $50,000. In October 2006, Kreutz was signed to a three-year contract extension through the 2010 season. In 2007, Kreutz was appointed as one of the team's captains.

In 2011, Kreutz chose to end his career with the Chicago Bears after turning down an offer of $4 million for one year. Kreutz was the longest tenured Bears member at the time he left the organization.

New Orleans Saints
On August 5, 2011, Kreutz signed with the New Orleans Saints for a one-year $2 million contract with an additional $2 million in incentives. Kreutz played in four of the Saints' first six games, missing the other two with a knee injury. He then decided to quit the team, saying that he had lost his "passion" for the game; the Saints were reportedly planning to move him to the "left team" list. In an interview, Kreutz cited offensive line coach Aaron Kromer's recurring expletive-laden tirades as the catalyst for his exit. A confrontation with Kromer resulted in Kreutz inadvertently throwing quarterback Drew Brees against a wall. After the incident, Kreutz stated, "it was time for me to go." He was waived after leaving the squad on October 22.

Post-retirement
On August 19, 2015, Kreutz signed on to be in the WSCR 670 the Score Bears post game show along with James Williams and Hub Arkush, replacing the recently deceased Doug Buffone.

In 2019, Kreutz joined NBC Sports Chicago's Football Aftershow, serving as a Bears gameday analyst alongside Laurence Holmes and former teammates Lance Briggs, Alex Brown, and Matt Forte. Kreutz joined CHGO, a Chicago sports media start-up, in 2022 but was fired in May for physically assaulting Adam Hoge, a fellow employee. Kruetz later replied to a PR message from CHGO on Twitter with a Mike Tyson quote, "Social media made y'all way too comfortable with disrespecting people and not getting punched in the face for it." Kreutz later apologized to Hoge and revealed he was also leaving NBC Sports Chicago.

Personal life
Kreutz is married to his high school sweetheart, Wendi; they have six children, and reside in Bannockburn, Illinois, but also have a winter home in Kalama Valley, Hawaii.

References

1977 births
Living people
All-American college football players
American football centers
Chicago Bears players
National Conference Pro Bowl players
New Orleans Saints players
Players of American football from Honolulu
Washington Huskies football players
Brian Piccolo Award winners